And Afterward, the Dark is a collection of stories by author Basil Copper. It was released in 1977 and was the author's second collection of stories published by Arkham House. It was published in an edition of 4,259 copies. One of the stories, "Camera Obscura", was produced in 1973 for the television series Night Gallery.

Contents

And Afterward, the Dark contains the following stories:

 "Introduction", by Edward Wagenknecht
 "The Spider"
 "The Cave"
 "Dust to Dust"
 "Camera Obscura"
 "The Janissaries of Emilion"
 "Archives of the Dead"
 "The Flabby Men"

References

1977 short story collections
Fantasy short story collections
Horror short story collections
Arkham House books